The Silent Power is a 1926 American silent drama film directed by Frank O'Connor and starring Ralph Lewis, Ethel Shannon and Charles Delaney. It was produced by the independent company Gotham Pictures.

Synopsis
The manager of a hydro-electric plant manages to secure his reckless college graduate son a job working on the construction of a new dam. He falls in love with a woman, but when her crazed brother kills his boss he is arrested and convicted for murder. Sentenced to the electric chair it seems that it will be the unfortunate duty of his father to supply the electricity that will execute his son.

Cast
 Ralph Lewis as John Rollins
 Ethel Shannon as Olive Spencer
 Charles Delaney as Rob Rollins
 Vadim Uraneff as Jerry Spencer
 Robert Homans as David Webster

References

Bibliography
 Connelly, Robert B. The Silents: Silent Feature Films, 1910-36, Volume 40, Issue 2. December Press, 1998.
 Munden, Kenneth White. The American Film Institute Catalog of Motion Pictures Produced in the United States, Part 1. University of California Press, 1997.

External links
 

1926 films
1926 drama films
1920s English-language films
American silent feature films
Silent American drama films
Films directed by Frank O'Connor
American black-and-white films
Gotham Pictures films
1920s American films